James C. Holperin (born December 18, 1950) is a retired American politician from Vilas County, Wisconsin.  He served in the Wisconsin State Senate (2009–2012) and State Assembly (1983–1994), representing northern Wisconsin.  He also served as secretary of the Wisconsin Department of Tourism from during the first term of Governor Jim Doyle.  He is the only state legislator in history to face recall twice, surviving both.

Early life and education
Holperin was born in Eagle River, Wisconsin, on December 18, 1950. In 1969, he graduated from Eagle River High School. In 1973, he earned a B.S. from the University of Wisconsin-Whitewater.

Career 
He served for nine years (1994-2003) as the director of Trees For Tomorrow, a natural resources specialty school focused primarily on conservation education for young people.

Assembly
In 1982, he successfully ran for the 46th District seat in the Wisconsin State Assembly representing Oneida and Vilas Counties. He served on the budget committee and the Joint Committee on Finance. After redistricting based on the 1980 Census, Holperin's district was re-designated as the 34th. In 1990, Holperin faced a recall effort due to his support for Native American treaty rights. At the center of the dispute was the controversy over the treaties between the federal government and the Chippewa tribe, in which the tribe ceded vast lands in northern Wisconsin in exchange for spearfishing, hunting, and timber harvesting rights. Holperin won the recall election handily, winning 61% of the vote. He retired in 1994. He was succeeded by Republican Joe Handrick.

Senate
In 2003, Governor Jim Doyle appointed him as Secretary of the Wisconsin Department of Tourism. In 2008, he ran to become a State Senator when incumbent Democratic Wisconsin State Senator Roger Breske decided to retire after four-plus terms (1990–2008). He defeated Republican nominee Tom Tiffany with 51% of the vote.

2011 Union protests

During the 2011 protests in Wisconsin, Holperin, along with the 13 other Democratic State Senators, left the state on February 17 to deny the State Senate a quorum on Governor Scott Walker's controversial budget repair bill. On March 9, Republicans in the State Senate declared that they had removed all fiscal provisions from the fiscal repair bill and passed it without needing a quorum. On March 12, Holperin and the rest of the Democratic Senators returned to Wisconsin.

2011 attempted recall

Holperin was one of three Democratic state senators facing recall as a result of the 2011 Wisconsin protests. On February 22, 2011, the "Jim Holperin Recall Committee" officially registered with the Wisconsin Government Accountability Board. 15,960 valid signatures of electors residing within the 12th District were required by April 25, 2011, to generate a recall election.

On March 10, 2011, supporters of the recall effort against Holperin complained of intimidation by his supporters. On April 21, 2011, Holperin recall supporters filed about 23,300 signatures on recall petitions.

Holperin and Kim Simac faced off in the general recall election on August 16, 2011. Holperin won, keeping his seat.

Election 2012
In March 2012, with his district having been drastically revised by the legislature, Holperin announced he would not seek re-election in 2012. He was succeeded in the new 12th District by Republican Tom Tiffany.

References

External links
Senator Jim Holperin at the Wisconsin State Legislature
constituency site
Jim Holperin for State Senate official campaign site
 
Campaign 2008 campaign contributions at Wisconsin Democracy Campaign

1950 births
Living people
Democratic Party Wisconsin state senators
Democratic Party members of the Wisconsin State Assembly
State cabinet secretaries of Wisconsin
People from Eagle River, Wisconsin
University of Wisconsin–Whitewater alumni
21st-century American politicians